Brida is a town in Algeria.

Brida may also refer to:

 Brida (novel), a 1990 novel by Paulo Coelho
 Brida District, Algeria
 BrIDA scan, cholescintigraphy using BrIDA radiotracer